The Futsal-Liiga is the premier futsal league in Finland. It was established in 1998.

Winners

External links
www.futsal.fi/liiga
futsalplanet.com

Futsal competitions in Finland
Finland
futsal
1998 establishments in Finland
Sports leagues established in 1998